Nashotah House is an Anglican seminary in Nashotah, Wisconsin. The seminary opened in 1842 and received its official charter in 1847. The institution is independent and generally regarded as one of the more theologically conservative seminaries in the Episcopal Church (United States). It is also officially recognized by the Anglican Church in North America. Its campus was listed on the National Register of Historic Places in 2017.

History
Nashotah House was founded by three young deacons of the Episcopal Church: James Lloyd Breck, William Adams, and John Henry Hobart, Jr., who were all recent graduates of the General Theological Seminary in New York City, at the bidding of Bishop Jackson Kemper. Gustaf Unonius was the first graduate.

Nashotah House was, from the beginning, a center for High Church thought and discipline. Breck, the first dean, was highly committed to the principles of the Oxford Movement. Later, noted professors such as James DeKoven would bring Anglo-Catholic worship and practice to the seminary. This began with the daily celebration of the Eucharist as well as the use of vestments, candles, and incense.

Nashotah House considers itself to be within the orthodox Anglo-Catholic tradition. Overall, the faculty support traditional theology and conceptions of Christian doctrine in opposition to liberal theologies. Graduates themselves come from a variety of jurisdictions both inside and outside of the Episcopal Church. Nashotah House sees its mission to form priests and church leaders from all over the Anglican Communion.

In February 2014, Bishop Edward L. Salmon, Jr. invited Bishop Katharine Jefferts Schori, the Presiding Bishop of the Episcopal Church, to preach at the school. The decision was condemned by the seminary's largely conservative supporters who cited Schori's tactics of suing parishes that left the ECUSA over doctrinal matters, as well as what they considered her heretical views. In response, two bishops who were members of the Nashotah House Board of Trustees resigned or distanced themselves from the school.

Academics
Nashotah House offers degree and certificate programs aimed at training clergy and lay leaders for ministries in the Anglican Communion:

Doctor of Ministry (D.Min.)
Master of Sacred Theology (S.T.M.)
Master of Divinity (M.Div.)  
Master of Pastoral Ministry (M.P.M.)
Master of Theological Studies (M.T.S.)  
Master of Arts in Ministry (M.A. in Ministry)

It also offers a one-year certificate program in Anglican studies, geared toward students who have received an M.Div. from a non-Anglican institution and wish to be ordained within the Anglican tradition. The Master of Pastoral Ministry and the M.A. in Ministry degree may be earned through a combination of residential and online study. 

The D.Min., S.T.M., M.Div., M.P.M., M.T.S. and M.A. in Ministry degrees are accredited by the Association of Theological Schools in the United States and Canada.

Campus

The property of the Nashotah House Theological Seminary covers 365 acres (148 ha) of land.

The main buildings of the seminary include, from oldest:
Chapel of St. Mary the Virgin, designed by James Douglas in Gothic Revival style and built in 1862.
Webb Hall (faculty and guest housing, the Chapel of Saints Peter and Paul), Gothic Revival style, built 1865 and added to in 1926 and 1950.
Shelton Hall (student housing), Gothic Revival style, built in 1869. Photo in box above.
Sabine Hall (faculty offices, student housing), designed by Alexander Eschweiler in Gothic Revival style, built in 1892, and expanded in 1910.
Lewis Hall (administration and faculty offices, the Saint Francis Oratory), designed by Eschweiler in Gothic Revival style and built in 1892.
Frances Donaldson Memorial Library, designed by John B. Sutcliffe in Collegiate Gothic style, built in 1911, and expanded in 1982.
Kemper Hall (classrooms, student housing, gymnasium), designed by Eschweiler & Eschweiler in Neogothic Revival style and built in 1956.
James Lloyd Breck Refectory, designed by Eschweiler & Eschweiler and built in 1965.

There are also apartments for both single and married students, and several houses for the dean and other faculty, as well as maintenance facilities.

Construction has been completed on a substantial addition to the refectory. The newly dubbed Adams Hall includes a large meeting hall and additional classrooms.

Student life

Nashotah began as a community inspired by traditional monastic life of prayer, work, and study. James Lloyd Breck's vision was to create a center for Christian formation in the (then) wilderness that would also be movement to propagate other communities for the purpose of evangelizing the frontier. Today, much of this vision remains intact and students still live a Benedictine cycle of prayer, work, and study. The life of the Seminary seeks to form the character of priests and leaders into the image of Christ. Various students have been involved in mission work around the Anglican Communion as well.

"Seminarians are invited to participate in an ascetic, disciplined, prayerful season of spiritual growth in Christ" in which they "practice the Benedictine Rule of daily prayer, labor, and study." All students have work crew assignments - cleaning bathrooms, mowing lawns, sweeping floors and taking other chores. Daily routine includes Morning Prayer, Mass, breakfast, classes, lunch, and Solemn Evensong. Always anticipated on the campus is the annual
St. Laurence Cup, a flag football game played against students from Sacred Heart School of Theology and St. Francis Seminary (Wisconsin). The formerly annual Lavabo Bowl game was played against Seabury-Western Theological Seminary which stopped granting residential Master of Divinity degrees in 2010 after ceasing to accept new M.Div. seminarians in 2008

Notable alumni
 

Keith Ackerman (born 1946), Bishop of Quincy
Robert Duncan (born 1948), archbishop, Anglican Church in North America; honorary doctorate 
Louis Falk (born 1935), bishop, Anglican Church in America 
Richard F. Grein (born 1934) bishop of Kansas and New York
Daniel W. Herzog (born 1941), Bishop of Albany
William Wallace Horstick (1902-1973), Bishop of Eau Claire
Benjamin Franklin Price Ivins (1884-1962), Bishop of Milwaukee
Russell Jacobus (born 1944), Bishop of Fond du Lac 
Charles Jenkins (1951–2021), Bishop of Louisiana
Hiram Kano (1889-1989), Japanese American priest
Greg Kerr-Wilson, archbishop of the Diocese of Calgary, metropolitan of the Ecclesiastical Province of Rupert's Land, Anglican Church of Canada
Christopher Kovacevich (1928–2010), metropolitan of Chicago, Serbian Orthodox Church
William Jay Lambert III (born 1948), bishop of Eau Claire
Jeffrey Lee, bishop of Chicago
Charles Wesley Leffingwell (1840-1928), editor of The Living Church
Edwin M. Leidel, Jr. (1938-2022), provisional bishop of Eau Claire
William H. Love (born 1957), bishop of Albany
Taylor Marshall, Catholic convert, spiritual writer
Esau McCaulley, African American biblical scholar at Wheaton College (Illinois)
John McKim (1852-1936), bishop of North Tokyo
Don Moon (born 1936), physicist, president of Shimer College
James Orin Mote (1922-2006), bishop in the Anglican Catholic Church
C. Wallis Ohl, Jr. (born 1943), provisional bishop of Fort Worth
Alan M. Olson (born 1939), philosopher
Mark Pae (born 1926), bishop of Taejong
Scott Seely (born 1981), bishop suffragan of All Nations
William C. R. Sheridan (1917–2005), bishop of Northern Indiana
Dabney Tyler Smith (born 1953), bishop
Harwood Sturtevant (1888-1977), bishop of Fond du Lac
Gustaf Unonius (1810-1902), priest, author
Reginald Heber Weller (1857-1935), bishop of Fond du Lac
Keith Bernard Whitmore (born 1945), bishop of Eau Claire
Gary Wilde (born 1952), priest, author

Notable faculty
 

Hans Boersma (born 1961), Chair to the Order of St. Benedict Servants of Christ Endowed Professorship in Ascetical Theology
Richard Fish Cadle (1796-1857), first superior of Nashotah House
James DeKoven (1831-1879), faculty member
Walter C. Klein, (1904-1980) Dean-President 1959-63, Bishop of Northern Indiana
Donald J. Parsons, (1922-2016), Professor, Dean-President 1950-1973, Bishop of Quincy
Harry Boone Porter (1923–1999), professor, editor of The Living Church
Michael Ramsey (1904-1988), Archbishop of Canterbury, adjunct professor
Edward L. Salmon, Jr. (1934-2016) Dean-President 2011-15, bishop of South Carolina
Arthur Anton Vogel (1924-2012), professor, bishop of West Missouri
William C. Wantland (born 1934), faculty member, bishop of Eau Claire
William Walter Webb (1857-1933), professor, president, bishop of Milwaukee
Louis Weil (1935-2022), professor of liturgics
Royden Yerkes (1881-1964)

References

External links
Official website
Historical resources on Nashotah House from Project Canterbury

Anglo-Catholic educational establishments
Episcopal Church (United States)
Seminaries and theological colleges in Wisconsin
Anglican Church in North America
Anglican seminaries and theological colleges
Education in Waukesha County, Wisconsin
Episcopal Church in Wisconsin
Educational institutions established in 1842
Buildings and structures in Waukesha County, Wisconsin
1842 establishments in Wisconsin Territory
National Register of Historic Places in Waukesha County, Wisconsin